Dohneh or Dahaneh or Dahneh or Dohineh or Duhinah or Dukhinakh may refer to:

Afghanistan
Dahaneh-ye Ghowri

Iran
Dahaneh, Golestan
Dahaneh Khvajeh Nafas, Golestan Province
Dahaneh-ye Porsu Qui, Golestan Province
Dahaneh-ye Dahandar, Hormozgan Province
Dahaneh-ye Meymand, Hormozgan Province
Dahaneh-ye Sohrab, Hormozgan Province
Dahaneh-ye Tavarkan, Hormozgan Province
Dahaneh-ye Abshuiyeh, Kerman Province
Dahaneh-ye Gomrokan, Kerman Province
Dahaneh Morghak, Kerman Province
Dahaneh Sar Asiyab, Kerman Province
Dahaneh-ye Ab Dar, Kerman Province
Dahaneh-ye Abbasali, Kerman Province
Dahaneh-ye Bagh, Kerman Province
Dahaneh-ye Khargan, Kerman Province
Dahaneh-e Zurak, Kerman Province
Dahaneh-ye Ojaq, North Khorasan Province
Dahaneh-ye Shirin, North Khorasan Province
Dohneh, Qazvin
Dahaneh-ye Chahal, Razavi Khorasan Province
Dahaneh-ye Heydari, Razavi Khorasan Province
Dahaneh-ye Sakhu, Razavi Khorasan Province
Dahaneh-ye Shur, Razavi Khorasan Province
Dahaneh, Sistan and Baluchestan
Dahaneh, South Khorasan
Dahaneh-ye Chah, South Khorasan Province
Dahaneh-ye Tangal, South Khorasan Province
Dohneh, Zanjan